Rizon Jet was an Arab charter airline founded in 2006, and headquartered in Doha, Qatar. Its business mainly focused on the chartering of private jets and luxury travel. It also provided lease of office space and conferencing facilities.

In addition to its Qatari operations, it also had operations in Bahrain, the United Arab Emirates, and the United Kingdom.

Fleet
The Rizon Jet fleet comprised the following aircraft as of August 2017:

References

Defunct airlines of Qatar
Airlines established in 2006
Airlines disestablished in 2016
Defunct charter airlines
Companies based in Doha